Brian Edwin McEvoy (born 11 July 1975) is a retired Irish hurler. He played for his local club James Stephens and with the Kilkenny senior inter-county team in the 1990s and 2000s.

References
 Brian McEvoy on hoganstand.com

1975 births
Living people
James Stephens hurlers
Kilkenny inter-county hurlers
All-Ireland Senior Hurling Championship winners